

Mainline routes

Special routes

References

External links

US